Fungai "Tostao" Kwashi (born 22 December 1979) is a Zimbabwean assistant football manager.

The Zimbabwe international was revealed as an assistant coach for CAPS United F.C. in 2014.
According to a sports correspondent, he was inspired by his father Steve "Dude" Kwashi to coach at his former club.

Playing career
He was handed his debut at age 16 in an encounter versus Black Aces in 1996.

Studying at Greenwich University while playing for Dartford F.C., he netted 17 goals and was admired for his goal-scoring ability by the fans.

Amateur club Gravesend & Northfleet were unable to condone his illicit behavior and decided to let him go at the end of the August 2003.

An array of European and African clubs expressed desire to sign him in 2008.

Vietnam
Often benched during his time with Thanh Hoa, the club could not tolerate his weak performance and parted ways with Tostao in 2010. Also, he was becoming progressively overweight.

Kwashi claimed he had played well and scored four goals for Xuan Thanh Sai Gon in 2012. After collating this source, Vietnamese news website ngoisao.net stated that he actually did not score any goals and made few appearances for the Vietnamese outfit.

Previous club  Thanh Hoa thought about trialing him after he asked them  if he could be paid a monthly salary of 1000 dollars in 2012. Eventually, they refused.
After leaving Xuan Thanh Sai Gon F.C., he was jobless for months and lived in an  African colleague's residence. Then, he returned to Zimbabwe and relied on his family for support.

When playing for V.League 2 outfit An Giang in 2013, he had to change to a midfield position even though he spent his entire career as a forward.

Personal life
President of Vietnam Nguyễn Minh Triết officially agreed to confer citizenship upon Kwashi Tostao in 2010.

References

External links
 
 

Zimbabwean footballers
Zimbabwe international footballers
Association football wingers
Association football forwards
Association football midfielders
Living people
1979 births
Dartford F.C. players
Margate F.C. players
CAPS United players
Zimbabwean expatriate footballers
Zimbabwean football managers
Expatriate footballers in Vietnam
Expatriate footballers in England
Fisher Athletic F.C. players
Expatriate footballers in Norway
V.League 1 players